The John Schwarz House is a home in Savannah, Georgia, United States. Built in 1890, it is located at 302–306 East Jones Street.

The building is part of the Savannah Historic District.

The home was built for John Schwarz, the 41st mayor of Savannah.

See also
Buildings in Savannah Historic District

References

Houses in Savannah, Georgia
Houses completed in 1890
Savannah Historic District